The molecular formula C17H17N (molar mass: 235.32 g/mol, exact mass: 235.1361 u) may refer to:

 Aporphine
 Azapetine

Molecular formulas